The More You Do It is the third album by soul singer Ronnie Dyson. It was released in 1976, and produced by Chuck Jackson and Marvin Yancy.

Reception

Track listing

Charts

Singles

External links
 Ronnie Dyson-The More You Do It at Discogs

References

1976 albums
Ronnie Dyson albums
Soul albums by American artists
Columbia Records albums